Ardenwood is a park and ride bus station in Fremont, California. It is located off California State Route 84, adjacent to the Ardenwood Historic Farm. It is served by AC Transit and Dumbarton Express transbay buses. 

An expanded lot and bus shelter opened in August 2009 at a cost of $8.3 million and was frequently filled within months of opening. A railway platform is planned to be constructed along the bordering Union Pacific Coast Line to serve the rerouted Capitol Corridor in 2026.

References

Buildings and structures in Fremont, California
Bus stations in Alameda County, California
Future Amtrak stations in the United States
Railway stations scheduled to open in 2026